The King's Awards for Enterprise, previously known as The Queen's Awards for Enterprise, is an awards programme for British businesses and other organizations who excel at international trade, innovation, sustainable development or promoting opportunity (through social mobility). They are the highest official UK awards for British businesses. The scheme was established as The Queen's Award to Industry by a royal warrant of 30 November 1965, and awards are given for outstanding achievement by UK businesses in the categories of innovation, international trade, sustainable development and promoting opportunity through social mobility.

Each award is valid for five years and winners are invited to a royal reception and are presented with the award at their company premises by one of the King's representatives, a Lord-lieutenant. Winners are also able to fly the King's Awards flag at their main office, and use the emblem on marketing materials such as packaging and adverts.

History
Every April winners of the Queen's Awards for Enterprise are officially announced in a special Gazette supplement. The Queen's Award to Industry, the scheme's original title, was instituted by Royal Warrant in 1965. It became the Queen's Awards for Export and Technology in 1975, with Environmental Achievement added in 1992. In 1999, the scheme became the Queen's Awards for Enterprise with International Trade, Innovation and Sustainable Development as the categories. In 2017, a fourth category was introduced, Promoting Opportunity (through social mobility). Since 2005, individuals have also been recognised with the Queen's Award for Enterprise Promotion. As of 2017, this individual award has been rested.

Organisations – totals
The total numbers of winners in each class each year are shown below.

Recipients – individuals

The Queen's Award for Enterprise Promotion is awarded to individuals.  Unlike the Queen's Award for Enterprise, nomination must be by a third party. As of 2017, this individual award has been rested.

See also
 The Queen's Award for Enterprise: International Trade (Export) (1980)
 The Queen's Award for Enterprise: International Trade (Export) (2006)
 The Queen's Award for Enterprise: International Trade (Export) (2007)
 The Queen's Award for Enterprise: International Trade (Export) (2008)
 The Queen's Award for Enterprise: International Trade (Export) (2009)
 The Queen's Award for Enterprise: International Trade (Export) (2010)
 The Queen's Award for Enterprise: International Trade (Export) (2011)

References

External links
 Official website
 London Gazette page
 Queen's Awards Magazine
 Lists of winners

 
British awards
Business and industry awards
Economy of the United Kingdom
British science and technology awards
Awards established in 1965
1965 establishments in the United Kingdom